Clidicus  may refer to:
 Clidicus (genus), a rove beetle genus
 Clidicus (Archon), an Archon of Athens from 733 BC to 723 BC